Social philosophy examines questions about the foundations of social institutions, social behavior, and interpretations of society in terms of ethical values rather than empirical relations. Social philosophers emphasize understanding the social contexts for political, legal, moral and cultural questions, and the development of novel theoretical frameworks, from social ontology to care ethics to cosmopolitan theories of democracy, natural law, human rights, gender equity and global justice.

Subdisciplines
There is often a considerable overlap between the questions addressed by social philosophy and ethics or value theory.  Other forms of social philosophy include political philosophy and jurisprudence, which are largely concerned with the societies of state and government and their functioning.

Social philosophy, ethics, and political philosophy all share intimate connections with other disciplines in the social sciences and the humanities.  In turn, the social sciences themselves are of focal interest to the philosophy of social science.

The philosophy of language and social epistemology are subfields which overlap in significant ways with social philosophy.

Relevant issues

Some topics dealt with by social philosophy are:
 Agency and free will
 The will to power
 Accountability
 Speech acts
 Situational ethics
 Modernism and postmodernism
 Individualism
 Crowds
 Property
 Rights
 Authority
 Ideologies
 Cultural criticism

Social philosophers

A list of philosophers that have concerned themselves, although most of them not exclusively, with social philosophy:

 Theodor Adorno
 Giorgio Agamben
 Hannah Arendt
 Alain Badiou
 Mikhail Bakunin
 Jean Baudrillard
 Walter Benjamin
 Jeremy Bentham
 Judith Butler
 Thomas Carlyle
 Chanakya
 Rabbi Manis Friedman
 Cornelius Castoriadis
 Noam Chomsky
 Confucius
 Simone de Beauvoir
 Guy Debord
 Vincenzo Di Nicola
 Émile Durkheim
 Terry Eagleton
 Friedrich Engels
 Julius Evola
 Michel Foucault
 Sigmund Freud
 Erich Fromm
 Giovanni Gentile
 Henry George
 Erving Goffman
 Jürgen Habermas
 Georg Wilhelm Hegel
 Martin Heidegger
 Thomas Hobbes
 Max Horkheimer
 Ivan Illich
 Carl Jung
 Ibn Khaldun
 Peter Kropotkin
 Jacques Lacan
 R. D. Laing
 Henri Lefebvre
 Emmanuel Levinas
 John Locke
 Georg Lukács
 Herbert Marcuse
 Everett Dean Martin
 Karl Marx
 Marshall McLuhan
 John Stuart Mill
 Huey P. Newton
 Friedrich Nietzsche
 Antonie Pannekoek
 Plato
 Fred Poché
 Karl Raimund Popper
 Pierre-Joseph Proudhon
 John Rawls
 Jean-Jacques Rousseau
 Sheila Rowbotham
 John Ruskin
 Bertrand Russell
 Jean-Paul Sartre
 Alfred Schmidt
 Arthur Schopenhauer
 Socrates
 Pitirim A. Sorokin
 Herbert Spencer
 Charles Taylor
 Thiruvalluvar
 Adolfo Sánchez Vázquez
 Max Weber
 John Zerzan
 Slavoj Žižek

See also

 Outline of sociology
 Social simulation
 Social theory
 Sociological theory
 Sociology

References

 
Interdisciplinary subfields of sociology